Headonhillia is an extinct genus of anguine lizard which existed in England during the Eocene epoch. It was first named by Jozef Klembara and Bryony Green in 2010, and represents one of the smallest anguines currently known. The type species is Headonhillia parva. Fossils have been found in the Hampshire Basin.

References

Fossil taxa described in 2010
Eocene lizards
Prehistoric life of Europe